Organolead chemistry is the scientific study of the synthesis and properties of organolead compounds, which are organometallic compounds containing a chemical bond between carbon and lead. The first organolead compound was hexaethyldilead (Pb2(C2H5)6), first synthesized in 1858. Sharing the same group with carbon, lead is tetravalent.

Going down the carbon group the C–X (X = C, Si, Ge, Sn, Pb) bond becomes weaker and the bond length larger. The C–Pb bond in tetramethyllead is 222 pm long with a dissociation energy of 49 kcal/mol (204 kJ/mol). For comparison the C–Sn bond in tetramethyltin is 214 pm long with dissociation energy 71 kcal/mol (297 kJ/mol). The dominance of Pb(IV) in organolead chemistry is remarkable because inorganic lead compounds tend to have Pb(II) centers. The reason is that with inorganic lead compounds elements such as nitrogen, oxygen and the halides have a much higher electronegativity than lead itself and the partial positive charge on lead then leads to a stronger contraction of the 6s orbital than the 6p orbital making the 6s orbital inert; this is called the inert pair effect.

By far the organolead compound that has had the greatest impact is tetraethyllead, formerly used as an antiknock agent in gasoline intended for internal combustion engines. The most important lead reagents for introducing lead are lead tetraacetate and lead(II) chloride.

The use of organoleads is limited partly due to their toxicity.

Synthesis
Organolead compounds can be derived from Grignard reagents and lead chloride. For example, methylmagnesium chloride reacts with lead chloride to tetramethyllead, a water-clear liquid with boiling point 110 °C and density 1.995 g/cm3. Reaction of a lead(II) source with sodium cyclopentadienide gives the lead metallocene, plumbocene.

Certain arene compounds react directly with lead tetraacetate to aryl lead compounds in an electrophilic aromatic substitution. For instance anisole with lead tetraacetate forms p-methoxyphenyllead triacetate:
CH3OC6H5  +  Pb(OAc)4  →  CH3OC6H4Pb(OAc)3  +  HOAc
The reaction is accelerated in the presence of dichloroacetic acid, which forms the lead(IV) dichloroacetate as an intermediate.

Other organolead compounds are the halides of the type RnPbX(4-n), sulfinates (RnPb(OSOR)(4−n)) and hydroxides (RnPb(OH)(4−n)). Typical reactions are:
 + HCl  → R3PbCl +  RH
 + SO2  → R3PbO(SO)R
R3PbCl + 1/2Ag2O (aq) → R3PbOH + AgCl
R2PbCl2 + 2 OH−  →  + 2 Cl−

 compounds are amphoteric. At pH lower than 8 they form R2Pb2+ ions and with pH higher than 10, R2Pb(OH)3− ions.

Derived from the hydroxides are the plumboxanes:

2 R3PbOH + Na  → (R3Pb)2O + NaOH + 1/2 H2

which give access to polymeric alkoxides:

(R3Pb)2O + R'OH → 1/n (R3PbOR')n - n H2O

Reactions 
The C–Pb bond is weak and for this reason homolytic cleavage of organolead compounds to free radicals is easy. In its anti-knocking capacity, its purpose is that of a radical initiator. General reaction types of aryl and vinyl organoleads are transmetalation for instance with boronic acids and acid-catalyzed heterocyclic cleavage. Organoleads find use in coupling reactions between arene compounds. They are more reactive than the likewise organotins and can therefore be used to synthesise sterically crowded biaryls.

In oxyplumbation, organolead alkoxides are added to polar alkenes:

H2C=CH-CN + (Et3PbOMe)n → MeO-CH2-HC(PbEt3)-CN → MeO-CH2-CH2-CN

The alkoxide is regenerated in the subsequent methanolysis and, therefore, acts as a catalyst.

Aryllead triacetates
The lead substituent in p-methoxyphenyllead triacetate is displaced by carbon nucleophiles, such as the  phenol mesitol, exclusively at the aromatic ortho position:

The reaction requires the presence of a large excess of a coordinating amine such as pyridine which  presumably binds to lead in the course of the reaction. The reaction is insensitive to radical scavengers and therefore a free radical mechanism can be ruled out. The reaction mechanism is likely to involve nucleophilic displacement of an acetate group by the phenolic group to a diorganolead intermediate which in some related reactions can be isolated. The second step is then akin to a Claisen rearrangement except that the reaction depends on the electrophilicity (hence the ortho preference) of the phenol.

The nucleophile can also be the carbanion of a β-dicarbonyl compound:

The carbanion forms by proton abstraction of the acidic α-proton by pyridine (now serving a double role) akin to the Knoevenagel condensation. This intermediate displaces an acetate ligand to a diorganolead compound and again these intermediates can be isolated with suitable reactants as unstable intermediates. The second step is reductive elimination with formation of a new C–C bond and lead(II) acetate.

Reactive intermediates
Organolead compounds form a variety of reactive intermediates such as lead free radicals:
Me3PbCl + Na (77 K) → Me3Pb.

and plumbylenes, the lead carbene counterparts:
Me3Pb-Pb-Me3  → [Me2Pb] 
[Me2Pb] + (Me3Pb)2 → Me3Pb-Pb(Me)2-PbMe3
Me3Pb-Pb(Me)2-PbMe3 → Pb(0) + 2 Me4Pb

These intermediates break up by disproportionation.

Plumbylidines of the type RPb (formally Pb(I)) are ligands to other metals in LnMPbR compounds (compare to carbon metal carbynes).

References

Further reading